Daniel Sumner may refer to:
Daniel H. Sumner (1837–1903), Wisconsin politician
Daniel A. Sumner, American economist